Shubenacadie 13 is a Mi'kmaq reserve located in Halifax County, Nova Scotia.

It is administratively part of the Shubenacadie First Nation. Michael Francklin established the reserve in 1779.

References

Indian reserves in Nova Scotia
Communities in Halifax County, Nova Scotia
Sipekneꞌkatik First Nation